Anthony Aaron Zych (born August 7, 1990) is an American former professional baseball pitcher. He pitched for the Seattle Mariners of Major League Baseball from 2015 through 2017. Zych is notable as the last player in alphabetical order among all of those who have ever played major league baseball.

Amateur career
Zych is from Monee, Illinois. He traveled  each way from Monee to attend St. Rita of Cascia High School in Chicago, Illinois, due to the higher level of competition offered in the Chicago Catholic League than he would have faced if he attended Crete-Monee High School. He played for the school's baseball team as a second baseman, and also occasionally served as their closing pitcher. As a senior, Zych had a .410 batting average and a 9–2 win–loss record.

After graduating from high school, the Chicago Cubs selected Zych in the 46th round of the 2008 Major League Baseball draft. He opted not to sign, and instead enrolled at the University of Louisville, where he played college baseball for the Louisville Cardinals. Competing in the Cape Cod Baseball League for the Bourne Braves in 2010, Zych received the league's Outstanding Relief Pitcher and Outstanding Pro Prospect awards. He served as the closer for Louisville.

Professional career

Chicago Cubs
The Chicago Cubs selected Zych in the fourth round of the 2011 Major League Baseball draft, and he signed with the Cubs. The Cubs assigned Zych to the Boise Hawks of the Class A-Short Season Northwest League in 2011. He began the 2012 season with the Daytona Cubs of the Class A-Advanced Florida State League, and was promoted to the Tennessee Smokies of the Class AA Southern League. After the 2012 season, the Cubs assigned Zych to the Mesa Solar Sox of the Arizona Fall League, where he had a 1.29 ERA in seven games. He returned to Tennessee in 2013, and had a 5–5 win–loss record and a 3.05 earned run average (ERA). He returned to Tennessee in 2014, and had a 4–5 win–loss record with a 5.09 ERA.

Seattle Mariners
At the end of spring training in 2015, the Cubs traded Zych to the Seattle Mariners for a player to be named later or cash considerations in the amount of $1. The Cubs eventually chose the dollar over a player. In 2015, Zych pitched for the Jackson Generals of the Southern League and the Tacoma Rainiers of the Class AAA Pacific Coast League. Between the two teams, he pitched to a 2.98 ERA with 55 strikeouts in  total innings. The Mariners promoted him to the major leagues on September 1, 2015. He made his major league debut on September 4. He had a 2.45 ERA with 24 strikeouts in  innings pitched for Seattle. , Zych's name ranks last alphabetically among the 19,000-plus to play in the major leagues.

Zych began the 2016 season with the Mariners, and allowed four earned runs in 12 innings pitched in April. After an appearance on May 1, 2016, Zych went on the disabled list with tendinitis in his right rotator cuff. He rested the shoulder until August. He made two appearances for the Mariners towards the end of the season, before he was shut down due to the shoulder pain During the 2016–17 offseason, he had a biceps tendon transfer surgery in his shoulder: a surgery that had never before been performed in an MLB player. He missed ten games of the 2017 season in April while recovering from the offseason shoulder surgery, and went on the disabled list in August 2017 with an elbow strain. Through 2017, Zych pitched to a 7–3 win–loss record and 2.72 ERA. He missed much of the 2016 and 2017 seasons with elbow and shoulder injuries. Again limited by injuries during spring training in 2018, the Mariners released Zych on March 10, 2018.

New York Yankees
On February 12, 2020, Zych signed a minor league deal with the New York Yankees. Zych did not play in a game in 2020 due to the cancellation of the minor league season because of the COVID-19 pandemic. He became a free agent on November 2, 2020.

References

External links

1990 births
Living people
People from Will County, Illinois
Baseball players from Illinois
Major League Baseball pitchers
Seattle Mariners players
Louisville Cardinals baseball players
Bourne Braves players
Arizona League Cubs players
Boise Hawks players
Daytona Cubs players
Tennessee Smokies players
Jackson Generals (Southern League) players
Tacoma Rainiers players
Arizona League Mariners players